Little City Roller Girls (LCRG) is a women's flat track roller derby league based in Johnson City, Tennessee. Founded in 2007 and competes against teams from other leagues. Little City is a member of the Women's Flat Track Derby Association (WFTDA).

History and organization
Founded in August 2007, the Roller Girls had about twenty skaters by mid-2010. The league has close links with junior roller derby league, The Little City Junior Rollers (ages 11-17) and the Little City Derby Brats (ages 6-11).

LCRG was accepted into the Women's Flat Track Derby Association Apprentice Program in July 2010, and became a full member of the WFTDA in September 2011.

The Little City Roller Girls moved into their new home in 2019 at Bristol Skateway in Bristol, Tennessee.

WFTDA rankings

References

Johnson City, Tennessee
Roller derby leagues established in 2007
Roller derby leagues in Tennessee
Women's Flat Track Derby Association Division 3
2007 establishments in Tennessee
Women's sports in Tennessee